The CNRS Silver Medal is a scientific award given every year to about fifteen researchers by the French National Centre for Scientific Research (CNRS). It is awarded to a researcher for "the originality, quality and importance of their work, recognised on a national and international level".

It is part of the "CNRS Talents" medals, along with the CNRS gold medal, which rewards a whole scientific career, the CNRS bronze medal, which rewards young researchers, the Innovation medal, which honours remarkable work in the technological, therapeutic, economic or societal fields, and the CNRS Crystal medal, which rewards research support staff.

Notable recipients 

 Gabriel Peyré (mathematics) (2021)
 Marie-Hélène Verlhac (biology) (2021)
 Margaret Maruani (sociology) (2014)
 Anca Muscholl (mathematics) (2010)
 Edith Heard (biology) (2008)

References 

French National Centre for Scientific Research awards